Stephen Mack Stigler (born August 10, 1941) is Ernest DeWitt Burton Distinguished Service Professor at the Department of Statistics of the University of Chicago.  He has authored several books on the history of statistics; he is the son of the economist George Stigler. 

Stigler is also known for Stigler's law of eponymy which states that no scientific discovery is named after its original discoverer (whose first formulation he credits to sociologist Robert K. Merton).

Biography 

Stigler was born in Minneapolis. He received his Ph.D. in 1967 from the University of California, Berkeley. His dissertation was on linear functions of order statistics, and his advisor was Lucien Le Cam. His research has focused on statistical theory of robust estimators and the history of statistics.  

Stigler taught at University of Wisconsin–Madison until 1979 when he joined the University of Chicago. In 2006, he was elected to membership of the American Philosophical Society, and is a past president (1994) of the Institute of Mathematical Statistics.

His father was the economist George Stigler, who was a close friend of Milton Friedman.

Bibliography

Books 

 
 
 

 As editor

Selected articles 

 ——— 
 ——— 
 ——— 
 
 
 ——— 
 ——— Stigler, S. M. (1980). Stigler's law of eponymy. Transactions of the New York Academy of Sciences, 39: 147–58 (Merton Frestschrift Volume, F. Gieryn (ed))
 ——— 
 ———

See also 
 Chicago school of economics
 George Stigler
 List of examples of Stigler's law
 Milton Friedman
 Stigler's law of eponymy

References

External links 
 Official CV of Stephen M. Stigler (September 2015)
 Homepage at the University of Chicago 
 Mathematics Genealogy Project: Stephen Mack Stigler

University of California, Berkeley alumni
Presidents of the Institute of Mathematical Statistics
Presidents of the International Statistical Institute
Elected Members of the International Statistical Institute
Fellows of the American Statistical Association
American statisticians
American historians of mathematics
University of Chicago faculty
Scientists from Minneapolis
American people of German descent
Living people
1941 births
Mathematicians from Minnesota
Members of the American Philosophical Society